Khao Khitchakut National Park is a national park in Chanthaburi Province, Thailand. The park is located in the Soi Dao Mountains, the Thai part of the much larger Cardamom Mountains, and is home to waterfalls and forests. The venerated Buddha footprint is also within the park premises. On 4 May 1977, Khao Khitchakut was designated Thailand's 14th National Park.

Geography
The park's area is 36,444 rai ~ . The park, one of Thailand's smallest national parks, borders the much larger Khao Soi Dao Wildlife Sanctuary.

Attractions
The Khao Phra Bat mountaintop is the site of a Buddha footprint and is an important religious place for Thai Buddhists. During the time around the Magha Puja holiday (in February or March) large numbers of visitors make the pilgrimage here. Also on Khao Phra Bat peak there are rock formations to which the shapes of various objects have been attributed: a pagoda, a monk's alms bowl, a turtle and an elephant.

The park's largest waterfall is Krathing, a waterfall of 13 separate levels, intersecting nature trails at various levels. These falls are fed by the Chanthaburi River. Other park waterfalls include Changsay and Klong Piboon.

Flora and fauna
Plant species in the park include Dalbergia cochinchinensis, Pterocarpus macrocarpus, Afzelia xylocarpa, Dipterocarpus tuberculatus, Xylia xylocarpa and Lagerstroemia calyculata. Animals in the park include gaur, Asiatic black bear, sambar, northern red muntjac and serow. Herds of wild elephants have also been sighted here. Bird life includes Asian koel, blue-winged pitta, hooded pitta and Oriental magpie-robin.

See also
List of national parks of Thailand
List of Protected Areas Regional Offices of Thailand

References

National parks of Thailand
Geography of Chanthaburi province
Tourist attractions in Chanthaburi province
1977 establishments in Thailand
Protected areas established in 1977
Cardamom Mountains